Noorsarai is a small town in Nalanda district of Bihar state in India. It is located on a highway joining the two capital cities Patna and Ranchi (capital of Jharkhand). Its distance from Patna is about 70 km.

Villages located in close proximity of Noorsarai include Brahmintoli(ambanagar), Chandasi, Kheman Bigha, Charuipar, Andhana, Muzafrapur, Jalalpur, jolahpura, Tharthari. Ambanagar is the main market of the area.
Noorsarai market is one of the biggest hub of agricultural machinery in the state of Bihar.

Villages in Nalanda district